"The Clod and the Pebble" is a poem from William Blake's 1794 collection Songs of Innocence and of Experience.

The poem

Summary
"The Clod and the Pebble" is the exemplification of Blake's statement at the beginning of Songs of Innocence and of Experience that it is the definition of the "Contrary States of the Human Soul". It shows two contrary types of love. The poem is written in three stanzas. The first stanza is the clod's view that love should be unselfish. The soft view of love is represented by this soft clod of clay, and represents the innocent state of the soul, and a childlike view of the world. The second stanza connects the clod and the pebble. It gives the location of the clod, pleasantly singing his view while being trodden on by a cattle. At the end of the 2nd line the shift in views is signaled by a semicolon. This shift is further emphasized with the use of the word "But" at the beginning of the third line. The pebble is meanwhile in the river warbling his view. The final stanza is the pebble's view of selfish love, and it is set up in a parallel structure to the clod's stanza on unselfish love.

Themes

Love
Different kinds of love are exemplified in this poem. According to Joseph Heffner the clod singing shows "his view on love, which connotes a blissful joyfulness" and he believes that love should be unselfish. The pebble meanwhile has the opposite view that love is in fact selfish. 
These differing views can also be seen as the difference between masculine and feminine love.

Innocence
The clod in this poem represents innocence. Its view of love is, according to Joseph Heffner, full of "childlike innocence." The choice of a clod of clay to represent this innocent view of love is significant because it is soft, and this view point is easily squished by life, or in this poem the foot of a cow. The clod also represents innocence because it is made of clay, the same material God used to mold Adam.

Experience
The pebble, with its solid and hard structure, represents being hardened by the experience of love and has, according to Joseph Heffner, gained authority through that experience. The pebble views love as something that is selfish. Also according to Joseph Heffner the use of the word "bind" by the pebble "suggests a sort of aggressive, violent and masculine view of love".

Literary influence
The last stanza of the poem, the pebble's view of selfish love, was used as the epigraph for Evelyn Scott's 1921 novel The Narrow House. According to Pat Tyler, the women in this novel have been "hardened by her life experiences. Each is solely concerned with her own survival, hardened to the suffering of the others".

The poem is also referenced, albeit misquoted, in the Goshawk by T. H. White.

References

External links
Comparison of hand painted extant copies of "The Clod and the Pebble" available from the William Blake Archive
An Annotated Bibliography of interpretations of the poem

1794 poems
Songs of Innocence and of Experience